The 1987 Stevenage Borough Council election took place on 7 May 1987. This was on the same day as other local elections. One third of the council was up for election; the seats which were last contested in 1983. The Labour Party retained control of the council, which it had held continuously since its creation in 1973.

Overall results

|-bgcolor=#F6F6F6
| colspan=2 style="text-align: right; margin-right: 1em" | Total
| style="text-align: right;" | 13
| colspan=5 |
| style="text-align: right;" | 25,926
| style="text-align: right;" | 
|-
|colspan="11" bgcolor=""|
|-
| style="background:"|
| colspan="10"| Labour hold

All comparisons in vote share are to the corresponding 1983 election.

Ward results

Bandley Hill

Bedwell Plash

Longmeadow

Martins Wood

Mobbsbury

Monkswood

Old Stevenage

Pin Green

Roebuck

St Nicholas

Shephall

Symonds Green

Wellfield

References

1987
1987 English local elections
1980s in Hertfordshire